"I Got a Woman" (originally titled "I've Got a Woman") is a song co-written and recorded by American R&B and soul musician Ray Charles.  Atlantic Records released the song as a single in December 1954, with "Come Back Baby" as the B-side. Both songs later appeared on the 1957 album Ray Charles (subsequently reissued as Hallelujah I Love Her So).

Origin
The song builds on "It Must Be Jesus" by the Southern Tones, which Ray Charles was listening to on the radio while on the road with his band in the summer of 1954, as well as a bridge inspired by Big Bill Broonzy's "Living on Easy Street". He and a member of his band, trumpeter Renald Richard, penned a song that was built along a gospel-frenetic pace with secular lyrics and a jazz-inspired rhythm and blues (R&B) background. The song would be one of the prototypes for what later became termed as "soul music" after Charles released "What'd I Say" nearly five years later.

Charles version
The song was recorded on November 18, 1954, in the Atlanta studios of Georgia Tech radio station WGST. It was a hit—Charles' first—climbing quickly to number one R&B in January 1955. Charles told the Pop Chronicles that he performed this song for about a year before he recorded it. The song would lead to more hits for Charles during this period when he was with Atlantic. It was later ranked No. 239 on Rolling Stones list of the 500 Greatest Songs of All Time, one of Charles' five songs on the list. A re-recorded version by Ray Charles, entitled "I Gotta Woman" (ABC-Paramount 10649) reached No. 79 on the Billboard pop chart in 1965.

Certifications

Elvis Presley version
Elvis Presley recorded his versions of the song on January 10, 1956, at RCA studio's in Nashville Tennessee. The single did not chart, although it was a staple in most of Presley's shows during the 1950s and when he returned to perform live in 1969 all the way through 1977.

The Beatles versions
The Beatles recorded two versions of the song for BBC radio. The first version was recorded on 16 July 1963 at the BBC Paris Theatre in London for the Pop Go The Beatles radio show. This version was first released in 1994 on the Live at the BBC compilation.

The second version the band recorded was recorded on 31 March 1964 at the Playhouse Theatre in London for the Saturday Club radio show. This version was released in 2013 for the On Air – Live at the BBC Volume 2 compilation and is shorter than the Live at the BBC version.

Cover versions, references and samples
Other versions that have made the pop or R&B charts in the US are those by Jimmy McGriff (#20 pop, #5 R&B, 1962), Freddie Scott (#48 pop, 1963), and Ricky Nelson (#49 pop, 1963).

The rock band Dire Straits mention the song in their song "Walk of Life", from their 1985 album Brothers in Arms at 2:44.

Kanye West's song "Gold Digger" contains samples of  "I Got a Woman"; one particular line is repeated throughout the song in the background. An interpolation by Jamie Foxx, who portrayed Charles in the 2004 biopic Ray,  of "I Got a Woman" serves as the introduction to "Gold Digger".

The John Mayer Trio covered the song in their 2005 live album "Try!".

References

1954 songs
1955 singles
Songs written by Ray Charles
Ray Charles songs
Elvis Presley songs
Bill Haley songs
The Beatles songs
Hep Stars songs
Van Morrison songs
Grammy Hall of Fame Award recipients
Atlantic Records singles
Song recordings produced by Jerry Wexler